Bennett S. LeBow is an American businessman and philanthropist. He is the current chairman of the board of Vector Group.

Education and career 
LeBow was born to a Jewish family, the son of Suara and Martin LeBow. His father was a life insurance salesman and his mother a teacher. He graduated from West Philadelphia High School and in 1960, earned a degree in electrical engineering from Drexel University. LeBow then went on to graduate school at Princeton University. Before completing his degree, LeBow left Princeton and joined the army where he installed early data systems at the Pentagon.

LeBow's first foray into business occurred in the 1960s when he started a computer company to continue his Pentagon project. LeBow eventually sold the business in 1971 for a profit and became a full-time investor. In 1980 he founded the investment holding company Brooke Group Ltd. LeBow went on to purchase many companies including: Western Union, Information Displays, MAI Basic Four, Liggett Group, Brigham's Ice Cream, and the trading card company, SkyBox International (which he sold to Marvel). In 2000, Brooke Group Ltd. was renamed Vector Group Ltd.

Cigarettes and litigation
In 1986, he purchased the fifth-largest cigarette manufacturer in the United States, the Liggett Group for $140 million. In 1993, Lebow stated under sworn testimony that since cigarettes are a legal product and people choose to use them, whether or not that they cause cancer is irrelevant. In 1996, while under his leadership, Liggett Group broke ranks with the rest of the US tobacco industry, including Philip Morris, Brown and Williamson, RJR Nabisco, Loews and Lorillard, when he announced that Liggett would settle the Medicaid tobacco suits brought by forty state attorneys general. Liggett had previously been accused of being illegally influenced by Philip Morris which allegedly paid some of Liggett's legal bills in order to buy its cooperation in anti-tobacco lawsuits. LeBow stated that the reason for the settlement was to obtain immunity for Liggett from future liabilities and to prevent a future bankruptcy. The settlement entailed that Liggett agree to pay $1 million in damages; publicly announce that smoking is addictive and causes cancer; turn over long-secret tobacco industry documents; disclose ingredients in its cigarettes; and testify against the industry. Liggett was the first cigarette company to voluntarily put the label "Nicotine is Addictive" on their product.

LeBow's actions were pivotal to the government in their signing of the Master Settlement Agreement. In addition to this, LeBow was honored with a proclamation by Florida Governor Lawton Chiles for his "invaluable assistance" in helping Florida achieve its historic $11.3 billion settlement with the tobacco industry. Following this presentation, Lebow and Mr. Chiles addressed a group of students, who "saved their toughest questions for Liggett Group chief Bennett Lebow of Miami". One student asked, "If you want to be a watchdog of the industry, why not get out altogether and stop making cigarettes?" to which he responded that if he did, others would continue. LeBow also developed, through Vector Tobacco Inc., the nicotine-free cigarette Quest (cigarette) which is a cigarette designed to help people quit smoking. Also that year LeBow teamed up with corporate raider Carl Icahn to make a bid for RJR Nabisco. In response to this proposed spin-off of Nabisco from RJR Reynolds, tobacco industry analyst Ellen Barabas stated that "I think there are people who would support a spin-off of Nabisco, but not by Lebow. One of the prime factors was Lebows dubious reputation as a manager. In 1994 his shareholders sued him, claiming he had taken millions of dollars in improper loans; Lebow settled out of court." 
According to court documents, Liggett, while under LeBow's leadership, "engage[d] in marketing tactics that appeal to youths, such as couponing, sampling, and 'buy one get one free' offers for its cigarettes, and advertise(d) in magazines with substantial youth readership."

Notable acquisitions
In 1987, Liggett bought a majority stake in Western Union which had a negative net worth of $200 million. The company, then renamed New Valley LLC, eventually filed for bankruptcy but was able to pay its bondholders in full via asset sales. Liggett later sold its remaining interest in Western Union Financial Services Inc for $1.2 billion earning it a $300 million profit.

In May 2010, after a $25 million investment, he became a member of the board of directors at Borders Group Inc. and was immediately elected chairman of the board, replacing Mick McGuire, who resigned. In June 2010, LeBow became CEO of Borders Group Inc. In February 2011, Borders declared bankruptcy.

LeBow is also chairman of the board of Vector Group, the holding company for Liggett Group, Vector Tobacco, New Valley LLC, and Douglas Elliman. He owns over 150,000 units of Vector stock that is worth $7.5 million.

Philanthropy and political activity
LeBow is a large supporter of his alma mater, Drexel University. In 1998, Drexel's College of Business and Administration was named the Bennett S. LeBow College of Business in his honor after a contribution of $10 million to the university. Further, he endowed the Bennett S. LeBow Engineering Center, a state-of-the-art facility that houses Drexel's College of Engineering. In November 2010, the 72-year-old West Philadelphia native contributed $45 million for the construction of a new facility for the LeBow College of Business — the 12th largest gift to any US business school, and the biggest ever to Drexel University. In 2011, LeBow was named the nation's 23rd largest charitable donor by The Chronicle of Philanthropy for donating more than $49 million to charitable causes.

In 2009, LeBow made a $10,000 campaign contribution to Manhattan District Attorney candidate Leslie Crocker Snyder, whose law firm - Kasowitz, Benson, Torres & Friedman - had represented the Liggett Group in smoking and health litigation since 1996.

Criticism

LeBow has also been scrutinized a number of times for a variety of decisions and business dealings:
 In 2005, LeBow resigned from the Dana–Farber Cancer Institute Board of Trustees shortly after his appointment over discussions about the propriety of associating with the owner of a company which sells products that are known to cause cancer.
 In 1993, Brooke Group Shareholder Frank Gyetvan sued LeBow on behalf of other company shareholders, claiming Brooke had improperly lent Lebow money for luxury personal items, such as a $21 million yacht. The suit was settled the following year, with LeBow repaying $16 million to Brooke's other shareholders and giving up his right to receive 6.25 million in preferred dividends.
 In 1989, LeBow was criticized for using $3 million to fly a planeload of friends to a London party for the launch of his 177-foot yacht. The trip came during the time LeBow controlled MAI Systems, an Irvine, Calif.-based computer network company, and Western Union. Both companies filed for Chapter 11 bankruptcy reorganization in 1993."
 In 1984, LeBow completed the sale of Information Displays which subsequently went bankrupt. The buyer sued LeBow and his partners for fraud and misrepresentation.
 In the past, LeBow's business associations have come into question. In the book "Red Mafiya: How the Russian Mob Has Invaded America", the author states: "Ukrainian mob boss Vadim Rabinovich attended a Clinton-Gore fund raiser at the Sheraton Bal Harbor Hotel in Miami. Rabinovich came as a guest of Bennett S. LeBow, the Chairman of Brooke Group Ltd, Parent of Liggett, a cigarette manufacturing company (LeBow refused to comment)." According to a spokesman for LeBow, LeBow's Brooke Group and Rabinovich developed a business center and luxury hotel in Kyiv.

Personal life
LeBow was first married to Geraldine Cosher whom he met while they were college students (he was at Drexel and she attended Temple University). They had two daughters. Geraldine died in 2011 after 52 years of marriage. As of 2014, Bennett LeBow is married to Jacqueline Finkelstein-LeBow, the principal of real estate investment firm JSF Capital.

See also
Timeline of Russian interference in the 2016 United States elections

References

Further reading
"LeBow Appears Set to Start A Skirmish for RJR Nabisco" The New York Times, August 30, 1995.
Liggett's Bennett LeBow Honored by Florida Governor Lawton Chiles and Attorney General Robert Butterworth, Business Wire,  October 21, 1997.

External links
Drexel University's LeBow College of Business

20th-century American businesspeople
21st-century American businesspeople
American chairpersons of corporations
American computer businesspeople
American entertainment industry businesspeople
American financiers
American food industry business executives
American investors
American manufacturing businesspeople
American philanthropists
Jewish American philanthropists
American retail chief executives
American technology company founders
American tobacco industry executives
Corporate raiders
Drexel Burnham Lambert
Drexel University alumni
Living people
Businesspeople from Philadelphia
Princeton University alumni
Private equity and venture capital investors
Western Union people
1938 births
21st-century American Jews
West Philadelphia High School alumni